Rick Partridge (born August 26, 1957) is a former American football punter. He played for the New Orleans Saints in 1979, the San Diego Chargers in 1980 and for the Buffalo Bills in 1987.

References

1957 births
Living people
American football punters
Utah Utes football players
New Orleans Saints players
San Diego Chargers players
Michigan Panthers players
Memphis Showboats players
New Jersey Generals players
Buffalo Bills players
Sportspeople from Orange, California